Aurora Basket Jesi is an Italian professional basketball club based in Jesi.
It plays in the second division Serie A2 as of the 2015-16 season.

History

In 1965, Gianni Rossetti (a television journalist for RAI), Carlo Barchiesi (current president) and Primo Novelli (then responsible for the club's junior sides) helped form Aurora Basket Jesi along with president Mario Gherardi.
At the time, Springoil had been strongest side of Jesi, flirting with a promotion to the top-tier, but it disappeared due to financial difficulties.
Roberto Vigo suggested to Gianni Rossetti that a basketball team should be set up within the Aurora Group.

The team started play during the 1965-66 season in the highest regional division.
Slowly moving up the divisions, the club moved up to the national Serie D in 1973.
Jesi moved up to the Serie C2 after the 1979-80 season, thanks to players such as Giovannini, Carnevali and Castelli from Fabriano and Paccapelo from Lineaerre Team Pesaro. 
The team reached the Serie C2 playoffs in its first season, the next season it lost in the finals against Basket Barcellona.
Jesi would achieve promotion to the Serie C1 after the 1983-84 season, finishing the regular season in second place before winning the promotion playoffs
They were relegated from the C1 at the end of their first season, but returned the following year.
Later returning to the Serie D, Jesi rejoined the Serie C in 1989-90.

The club reached the second division Serie A2 after the 1996-97 season in which it beat Gaverina Bergamo in the playoff finals in May 1997.
The 1999-00 season saw the side reach the Final Eight of the Italian Cup, the 2003-04 season saw a historic promotion to the Serie A.

However, the club struggled in the Serie A, firing coach Luigi Gresta as they were relegated.
in 2005, they would recruit coach Luca Banchi and small-forward Romain Sato, reaching the playoffs at the end of the season.
The Latini family, major backers, withdrew their sponsorship of a club they had helped for sixteen years at the end of the season.
In 2006, the club scrambled to find new financing, ultimately securing backing, with Fileni becoming their main sponsor.
A team containing Brion Rush reached the playoffs, losing in the semifinals.

Arena
When it was starting to play in the Serie D, the team used to practice at the Jesi Fencing Club gymnasium and later on in a newly constructed gym in the San Sebastiano area of Prato Road.

The club plays in the UBI BPA Sport Center (capacity:3,500), opened in 1992, as of the 2015-16 season.

Notable players 

2000s
  Michele Maggioli 13 season: '01-'11 and '14 -'17 
  David Moss 1 season: '07-'08
  Brion Rush 1 season: '06-'07
  Romain Sato 1 season: '05-'06
  Tony Dorsey 1 season: '05-'06
  Goran Jurak 1 season: '04-'05
  Cory Violette 1 season: '04-'05
  Mario Boni 1 season: '04-'05
  Rodolfo Rombaldoni 1 season: '04-'05
  Jamal Robinson 1 season: '03-'04
  James Singleton 1 season: '03-'04
  Brett Blizzard 1 season: '03-'04
  Trent Whiting 1 season: '03-'04
   Raymond Tutt 2 seasons: '02-'03, '04-'05
  Joshua Davis 1 season: '02-'03
  Mason Rocca 3 seasons: '01-'04
   Michael Williams 1 season: '01-'02
  Bakari Hendrix 1 season: '01-'02
  Myron Brown 1 season: '01-'02
  Roy Rogers 1 season: '01-'02
  Damir Tvrdic 1 season: '00-'01
  Claudio Pol Bodetto 1 season: '00-'01
  Walter Berry 1 season: '00-'01

1990s
   Mario Gigena 4 seasons: '99-'03
  Alexander Lokhmanchuk 1 season: '99-'00
  Adrian Autry 1 season: '99-'00
  Raymond Brown 1 season: '98-'99
   Steve Carney 1 season: '98-'99
   Gordan Firić 3 seasons: '97-'00
  Jean Prioleau 2 seasons: '97-'99
  Anthony Pelle 1 season: '97-'98

Sponsorship names
Throughout the years, due to sponsorship, the club has been known as:
Sicc Jesi (1992–2006)
Fileni Jesi (2006–2015)
Betulline Jesi (2016)
Termoforgia Jesi (2017-)

References

External links 
 Serie A historical results  Retrieved 23 August 2015

1966 establishments in Italy
Basketball teams established in 1966
Basketball teams in the Marche